S. Sundararaj is an Indian politician and incumbent member of the Tamil Nadu Legislative Assembly from Paramakudi constituency. He is EX Minister for  sports and youth welfare of the Govt. of Tamil Nadu. He was elected to the Tamil Nadu legislative assembly as an Anna Dravida Munnetra Kazhagam (Jayalalitha) candidate from Paramakudi constituency in 1989 election and 1991 election as an Anna Dravida Munnetra Kazhagam candidate.

A cabinet reshuffle by Jayalalithaa in November 2011 saw Sundararaj replace B. V. Ramanaa as Minister for Handlooms, while Ramanaa became Minister for the Environment.

He was criticised of humiliating young women hockey players during his visit at the school.

References 

All India Anna Dravida Munnetra Kazhagam politicians
Living people
State cabinet ministers of Tamil Nadu
Year of birth missing (living people)
Tamil Nadu MLAs 1991–1996